The Virginia Constitutional Convention of 1902 was an assembly of delegates elected by the voters to write the fundamental law of Virginia. The 1902 Constitution's severe restrictions of suffrage among both blacks and whites was proclaimed without submitting it to the people.

Background and composition
In May 1900, the increasing public dismay over the electoral fraud and corruption of the Democratic machine under U.S. Senator Thomas S. Martin led to a narrow victory over the entrenched "court house crowd" in a referendum to call a constitutional convention. 

Reformers seeking to expand the influence of the "better sort" of voters gained a majority by appealing to the electorate to overthrow the 1868 Underwood Constitution, that the Richmond Dispatch characterized as "that miserable apology to organic law which was forced upon Virginians by carpetbaggers, scalawags and Negroes supported by Federal bayonets".

The tone was set by the Progressive editor of the Lynchburg News, Carter Glass, who would later hold a U.S. Senate seat for 26 years, believed that the purpose of the convention was "the elimination of every Negro who can be gotten rid of, legally, without materially impairing the strength of the white electorate." Progressives also had a deep distrust of the influence railroads had over state legislatures, and Convention delegate A. Caperton Braxton of Staunton, while agreeing that "negroes should be excluded from the right to hold office in this state", was also concerned that the state regulate railroads, that the Convention had to decide whether "the people or the railroads would control the government of the Commonwealth."

Meeting and debate
The Convention met from June 12, 1901 - June 26, 1902, at Richmond in the Capitol Building and elected John Goode, Jr. its presiding officer. Progressives sought to reform corrupt political practices of the Martin political machine and to regulate railroads and big corporations. Martin delegates agreed to restrict suffrage of African-Americans and illiterate whites, and a State Corporation Commission was established, but the Martin machine persisted in controlling Virginia politics until his death. The Convention's president, John Goode of Bedford City, had been a secessionist voting in Richmond's 1861 Secession Convention. He opened the Convention in 1901 explaining that voting was not a natural right, it was a "social right an must necessarily be regulated by society…", though any regulation could not violate the Constitution of the United States. While there was "no prejudice, no animosity against the members of the colored race", the wisest of Virginia's leaders had counseled against universal negro suffrage as "a crime against civilization and Christianity." 

Walter Allen Watson of Nottoway County, was the sitting Commonwealth's Attorney and a member of the Martin machine's Democratic State Committee; he would later serve at a Virginia Circuit Court Judge. Watson held that the purpose of the Convention movement in Virginia as endorsed in popular referendum was "the elimination of the negro from the politics of this state." The majority of the Convention quickly followed his lead by adopting a two-stage restriction of the electorate. First, for one year, property qualifications were reinstated, this time allowing any male citizen paying one dollar in property tax to vote, along with any Civil War veteran, or the son of a veteran, blue or grey, white or black. The second step was imposition of a poll tax to be paid for three consecutive years annually prior to voting.

More controversial was the proposal for an "understanding" clause requiring each applicant to demonstrate an understanding of the Constitution to a county registrar. Alfred P. Thom, a railroad lawyer from Norfolk, explained "I would not expect an impartial administration of the clause." There would be no "friendship by the white man to the suffrage of the black man", but on the other hand, Thom did not expect a rigid examination for a white man, "this clause will not exclude any worthy white citizen of this Commonwealth from the suffrage…he will find a friendly examiner." Robert William Blair of Southwest Wythe County objected to the provisions proposed by Carter Glass which were the same methods used to bring disenfranchisement other Southern states. The understanding clause would give too much power to the "caprice and corruption of a dishonest election officer." In western Virginia, hundreds would be unable to meet the new requirements, without enough property, unable to pay the poll tax for three consecutive years, or who would fail the registrar's examination on Constitutional understanding.

Outcomes

The Convention imposed a system of poll taxes along with literacy and understanding requirements to vote that had the effect of restricting the electorate. The outcome was almost immediate disenfranchising of blacks and half the previous number of whites voting. The Convention instituted a State Corporation Commission to regulate railroads, and it was upheld in the Virginia Supreme Court of Appeals. But it had no independence from the Martin political machine because the Governor appointed all three commissioners. Two years later the father of the State Corporation Commission became a corporate attorney for the Richmond, Fredericksburg and Potomac Railroad.

Chart of delegates
The delegates to the Virginia Convention of June 12, 1901 to June 26, 1902 were elected the fourth Thursday in May, 1901. (One hundred members, from House of Delegates districts.)

See also
Virginia Conventions

References

Bibliography

External links
Report of the Proceedings and Debates of the Constitutional Convention, State of Virginia … 1901–1902 from the Duke University Libraries at archive.org

American constitutional conventions
Political history of Virginia
1901 in Virginia
1902 in Virginia
1901 in American politics
1902 in American politics